The West Indies cricket team embarked on a tour of India in 1983–84 following their surprise defeat to India in 1983 World Cup. Captained by Clive Lloyd, the West Indies played six Test matches against India as well as five ODI in addition to other first class matches. The series  also known as Revenge Series  ended with West Indies winning three tests and winning all the five ODIs. The series displayed Indian batsmen struggling to play against the West Indies pace attack. In most of the matches India lost about 4-5 wickets even before reaching 50 runs. The disastrous 3-0 loss was the widest ever margin of defeat on home soil. Despite the poor performance of Indian players, India did manage to create some records in this series. Kapil Dev produced his career best innings spell in this series of 9 wickets in an innings for 83 runs and Gavaskar scored his career best 236 not out in this series. This knock of 236 runs not out took him past Donald Bradman's record of 29 test hundreds and Vinoo Mankad's record score of 231.

There were various other highlights in these series. In  the 5th Test, the crowds upset with India's poor performance blamed Sunil Gavaskar  and he was pelted with stones and rotten fruits. The first ODI of this series played at Srinagar was the first ever international match played there. The host team was constantly booed by a section of the crowd. There were protests by separatists who dug up the pitch during the lunch break. This series saw debuts by Richie Richardson, Roger Harper, Chetan Sharma, Navjot Sidhu and Raju Kulkarni. Andy Roberts and Yashpal Sharma went into retirement after playing their last matches in this series. The third Test at Gujarat Stadium in Ahmedabad was the first test match ever played on this ground. After the sixth Test, total wickets taken by Malcolm Marshall was 33 wickets which equalled the West Indian record for most wickets in a series. In the same Test, Winston Davis was struck by a missile thrown by a spectator which led to captain Clive Lloyd pulling out his team back to pavilion. The match was resumed only after Lloyd received assurances from the state Governor that security would be increased.

Squads

Test matches

First Test

Second Test

Third Test

In the Indian second innings, six batsman scored just one run each.

Fourth Test

Fifth Test

Sixth Test

ODIs

The West Indies won the Charminar Challenge Cup 5-0.

1st ODI

2nd ODI

3rd ODI

4th ODI

5th ODI

First-class matches

References

External links 
 The West Indians in India, 1983-84 by Wisden

1983 in Indian cricket
1983 in West Indian cricket
1984 in Indian cricket
1984 in West Indian cricket
International cricket competitions from 1980–81 to 1985
1983-84
Indian cricket seasons from 1970–71 to 1999–2000